Buti Kgwaridi Manamela (born 10 July 1979) is currently serving as the Deputy Minister of Higher Education, Science and Technology, having previously served as the Deputy Minister for Planning and Monitoring in the Presidency since 26 May 2014. He is currently serving under the current Minister of Higher Education, Science and Technology Blade Nzimande and current President of South Africa, Cyril Ramaphosa. Manamela has also held the post of the spokesperson to former president, Jacob Zuma.

Biography

Birth and education
Buti Manamela was born in the town of Modimolle, Transvaal Province, South Africa. He joined Congress of South African Students (COSAS) and the African National Congress Youth League at the age of thirteen. He matriculated from Phagameng High School. He then enrolled at the Mamelodi College where he obtained a certificate in electronics in 2001. During his time at the college, he joined the South African Students Congress, the Young Communist League of South Africa, the South African Communist Party and the African National Congress. He completed his post-graduate diploma in 2014 and obtained a Master of Management in Public Policy from the University of the Witwatersrand in 2017.

Political career
In 2000 he was deployed to be the National Organiser of the South African Commercial Union in South Africa. Due to his organising skills, he initiated the re-establishment of the Young Communist League in 2003. Manamela was elected the National Secretary of the YCLSA and served in the post until 2014. Manamela became a Member of Parliament following the 2009 general election. He served as the chief volunteer of Parliament's Nelson Mandela Day activities and was a whip of the Labour Portfolio Committee.

In the cabinet of former President Jacob Zuma, Manamela served as the Deputy Minister of Planning Monitoring and Evaluation and also head of the Youth Development and Administration.

Manamela is also serving as a Central Committee Member of the South African Communist Party (SACP) and has been an ANC Member of Parliament since the 2009 general election.

Personal life 
Manamela is married and has two children. His wife is Nomvuyo Mhlakaza-Manamela.

See also

African Commission on Human and Peoples' Rights
Constitution of South Africa
History of the African National Congress
Politics in South Africa
Provincial governments of South Africa

References

External links
Deputy Minister Buti Manamela - The Presidency, Republic of South Africa
Buti Manamela :: People's Assembly

1979 births
Living people
African National Congress politicians
Members of the National Assembly of South Africa